Ape index, ape factor, or gorilla index is slang or jargon used to describe a measure of the ratio of an individual's arm span relative to their height.  A typical ratio is 1, as identified by the Roman writer, architect and engineer Vitruvius prior to 15 BC. Vitruvius noted that a "well made man" has an arm span equal to his height, as exemplified in Leonardo da Vinci's c. 1492 drawing, the Vitruvian Man. In rock climbing it is believed that an ape index greater than one, where the arm span is greater than the height, provides for a competitive advantage, and some climbers have expressed the belief that exercise can result in an improved ratio, although this view is somewhat controversial.

Computation 

The ape index is usually defined as the ratio of arm span to height. 
However, an alternative approach is arm span minus height with the result being positive, 0 or negative.
Unlike the unitless ratio, this calculation produces a numeric value in the units of measurement used to represent the height and arm span.

Significance in rock climbing 

Multiple studies have been conducted into the effect of physiological factors, such as anthropometry and flexibility, in determining rock climbing ability. A number of these have included the Ape Index as one of the variables. However, the results have been mixed.

One study found that "untrainable" physical factors, including the Ape Index, were not necessarily predictors of climbing ability, in spite of a general tendency identified in previous studies for elite athletes in the sport to share these characteristics. This was supported by a later study that also found that the Ape Index was not statistically relevant. However, the authors of this second study noted that the findings may have been due to the low variability in the index between the climbers, who all had significantly higher Ape Indices than those found in the control group. Thus they left open the possibility that the Ape Index may be more significant when there is a greater degree of equivalence between the other traits under consideration.

Countering these studies are other works that have identified the Ape Index as a significant (or potentially significant) factor. A 2001 study comparing teenage male and female rock climbers noted that performance differences between the genders could be explained by a number of factors, one of which was the lower Ape Index found in the female climbers. Similarly, in a later work it was found that the Ape Index was statistically significant, and thus determined that it was one of a number of variables that provided the highest diagnostic value in the prediction of climbing performance.

Other sports 
It has been noted that swimmers tend to have longer arms in relation to their body size. A notable example is Michael Phelps whose arm span is 10 cm greater than his height, affording him an index of 1.052.

There is evidence to support that having a higher index will be beneficial to a football goalkeeper . It can also compensate for being shorter than the recommended norm for a professional goalkeeper. Iker Casillas and Jorge Campos are examples of shorter goalkeepers who possess a higher than average index.

In basketball, a higher index helps with defense, especially in contesting shots and intercepting passes . It also helps with rebounding, and with dribbling or passing under pressure. Finally, it directly helps shooting under pressure. David Epstein in his book The Sports Gene devoted a chapter to "The Vitruvian NBA Player" and therein noted "The average arm-span-to-height ratio [i.e., ape index] of an NBA player is 1.063." Having an ape index of less than 1 is very rare among NBA players; only two players in the NBA 2010–11 season had one.

At combat sports, such as boxing and mixed martial arts, having a higher index is often perceived to be beneficial. Fighters such as Jon Jones, whose arm span is 21 cm greater than his height, and Conor McGregor have a longer arm span than most of their opponents. This potentially allows them to use their arm span to hit their opponents, whereas their opponents could not hit them. They often use this in their game plan, by keeping their distance, allowing them to cover up (as longer arms allow for a greater area of protection around the upper body) or use it to counter punch them. However, research has shown that the ape index has no influence on who wins or loses MMA bouts, an individual's divisional ranking, or whether or not they are successful in their technique use.

Small ape indices can also be beneficial. For example, in the bench press, a lifter with shorter arms must move the weight a shorter distance to complete the lift when compared to a lifter with longer arms. Yet there is the fact that a shorter bone will have a shorter muscle therefore the potential mass of the muscle is based on bone length.  In contrast, long arms are an advantage in the deadlift, where longer arms reduce the range of motion required to complete the lift.

Notes

References

External links
Ape Index Calculator
Is height important for a soccer goalkeeper?

Climbing and health
Anthropometry